Rear-Admiral Sir Joseph Knight (c.1708 – 18 July 1775) was a senior Royal Navy officer who served as Commander-in-Chief, East Indies Station from 1752 to 1754.

Naval career
Knight joined the Royal Navy in 1727. Promoted to captain on 31 July 1746, he was given command of the fourth-rate  and then, later that year, the fourth-rate , in which he took part in the raid on Lorient in September 1746 and then sailed out to the far east and served as Commander-in-Chief, East Indies Station from 1752 to 1754. He went on to command, successively, the fifth-rate , the third-rate  (in which he took part in the capture of Gorée in 1758), the fourth-rate , the third-rate  (in which he took part in the siege of Havana in 1762), the third-rate  and the second-rate .

His daughter was the author, Ellis Cornelia Knight.

References

Royal Navy rear admirals
1708 births
1775 deaths